Extended synaptotagmin-1 is a protein in humans that is encoded by the ESYT1 gene.

References

Further reading